"Be Right There" is a song recorded by producers Diplo and Sleepy Tom, featuring uncredited vocals from Priscilla Renea (Now known as "Muni Long"). It incorporates lyrics from the 1992 song "Don't Walk Away" by Jade. The song was also featured in the Chinese-French action-adventure film The Warriors Gate and in the soundtrack of the 2016 video game Forza Horizon 3.

Music video
The song's accompanying music video premiered on December 15, 2015, on Mad Decent's YouTube account.

Charts

Weekly charts

Year-end charts

Certifications

References

2015 singles
2015 songs
Songs written by Diplo
Songs written by Ronald Spearman
Songs written by Vassal Benford